Uncle Remus is the fictional title character and narrator of a collection of African American folktales compiled and adapted by Joel Chandler Harris and published in book form in 1881. Harris was a journalist in post-Reconstruction era Atlanta, and he produced seven Uncle Remus books.  He did so by introducing tales that he had heard and framing them in the plantation context. He wrote his stories in a dialect which was his interpretation of the Deep South African-American language of the time. For these framing and stylistic choices, Harris's collection has garnered controversy since its publication. Many of these stories are believed to have Creek Indian influence too.

Structure

Uncle Remus is a collection of animal stories, songs, and oral folklore collected from southern black Americans. Many of the stories are didactic, much like those of Aesop's Fables and Jean de La Fontaine's stories. Uncle Remus is a kindly old freedman who serves as a story-telling device, passing on the folktales to children gathered around him, like the traditional African griot.

The stories are written in an eye dialect devised by Harris to represent a Deep South Black dialect. Uncle Remus is a compilation of Br'er Rabbit storytellers whom Harris had encountered during his time at the Turnwold Plantation. Harris said that the use of the Black dialect was an effort to add to the effect of the stories and to allow the stories to retain their authenticity. The genre of stories is the trickster tale. At the time of Harris's publication, his work was praised for its ability to capture plantation Black dialect.

Br'er Rabbit ("Brother Rabbit") is the main character of the stories, a character prone to tricks and troublemaking, who is often opposed by Br'er Fox and Br'er Bear. In one tale, Br'er Fox constructs a doll out of a lump of tar and puts clothing on it. When Br'er Rabbit comes along, he addresses the "tar baby" amiably but receives no response. Br'er Rabbit becomes offended by what he perceives as the tar baby's lack of manners, punches it and kicks it, and becomes stuck.

Related works
Harris compiled six volumes of Uncle Remus stories between 1881 and 1907; a further three books were published posthumously, following his death in 1908.

 Uncle Remus: His Songs and His Sayings (1881)
 Nights with Uncle Remus (1883)
 Uncle Remus and His Friends (1892)
 The Tar Baby and Other Rhymes of Uncle Remus (1904)
 Told by Uncle Remus: New Stories of the Old Plantation (1905)
 Uncle Remus and Brer Rabbit (1907)
 Uncle Remus and the Little Boy (1910)
 Uncle Remus Returns (1918)
 Seven Tales of Uncle Remus (1948)

Adaptations in film and other media

Comics
In 1902, artist Jean Mohr adapted the Uncle Remus stories into a two-page comic story titled Ole Br'er Rabbit for The North American.

The McClure Newspaper Syndicate released a Br'er Rabbit Sunday strip drawn by J. M. Condé from June 24 to October 7, 1906.

An Uncle Remus and His Tales of Br'er Rabbit newspaper Sundays-only strip (King Features Syndicate) ran from October 14, 1945, through December 31, 1972, as an offshoot of the Disney comics strip Silly Symphony.

Films and TV
Films
 Walt Disney's Song of the South (1946), a live action/animated musical drama with James Baskett as Remus
 Ralph Bakshi's film Coonskin (1975), a satire of the Disney film which adapts and mocks the Uncle Remus stories in a contemporary Harlem setting
 The Adventures of Brer Rabbit (2006) from Universal Animation Studios, a modern adaptation of the stories featuring the voice of Nick Cannon as the title character

TV
 Rémusz bácsi meséi (1967) from Magyar Televízió, a Hungarian 13 episode television series.
 Jänis Vemmelsäären seikkailut (1987–1988) from Yle, an eight-part Finnish television series that aired on Yle TV2, as a part of the children's show Pikku Kakkonen.
 Brer Rabbit Tales (1991), a 47-minute television film written and directed by Al Guest and Jean Mathieson for Emerald City Productions.
 Brer Rabbit's Christmas Carol (1992) from Island Animation and Magic Shadows, a 58-minute sequel to the earlier film from the same writer-director staff retreading the plot of Charles Dickens's A Christmas Carol with the Remus characters.

Music 
Uncle Remus appears heavily as a supporting character in The Residents' rock opera, Not Available, recorded in 1974 and released in 1978. After returning from Easter Island, he provides unhelpful, dismissive advice to the lead character, quoting "Well, strangers have left on longer trains before", in response to his cries for help and understanding.

"Uncle Remus" is a song by Frank Zappa and George Duke from Zappa's 1974 album Apostrophe (').

In Bob Dylan's epic poem "Last Thoughts on Woody Guthrie", the author lists several people that are commonly looked to for hope and inspiration, saying "that stuff ain't real". In one verse of the poem, he says "And Uncle Remus can't tell you and neither can Santa Claus."

In the song "Good Ole Boys Like Me" Uncle Remus "put me to bed".

See also
 List of Uncle Remus characters
 Tar-Baby
Magical Negro

References

Bibliography
  Short biography of Joel Chandler Harris with photograph
  References in Theodore Roosevelt's autobiography to Brer Rabbit and Uncle Remus.

External links 

 Full text of books by Uncle Remus from Project Gutenberg
 Official Uncle Remus Museum in Eatonton, GA
 Official Site of Uncle Remus
 
Uncle Remus tales in Ukrainian translation

Black people in literature
Characters in American novels of the 19th century
Fictional African-American people
Fictional people from the 19th-century
Fictional slaves
Fictional storytellers
Literary characters introduced in 1881
Male characters in literature
Song of the South characters